Cinthia Martinez (born ) is a Uruguayan female  track cyclist, and part of the national team. She competed in the 500 m time trial event at the 2009 UCI Track Cycling World Championships.

References

External links
 Profile at cyclingarchives.com

1989 births
Living people
Uruguayan track cyclists
Uruguayan female cyclists
Place of birth missing (living people)